Bryodemella tuberculata is a grasshopper species in the subfamily Oedipodinae. It is found  in  Central and Northern Europe. Their habitat is sparsely overgrown, sandy heaths, as well as gravel areas on mountain rivers and streams. The species has the largest genome of any insect studied so far.

References

Orthoptera of Europe
Insects described in 1775
Taxa named by Johan Christian Fabricius
Oedipodinae